Compatriots of South Africa (CSA) is a South African political party that focuses its efforts on Coloured South Africans, titling its manifesto "The Manifesto for the Forgotten People of South Africa".

The party is supportive of land expropriation without compensation for the descendants of the "Khoi, San, Griqua and Bushmen".

CSA contested the 2019 general election at national level only, failing to win a seat.

The party contested a number of wards in the 2021 local government elections, winning one seat in the Dr Beyers Naudé Local Municipality.

Election results

National elections

|-
! Election
! Total votes
! Share of vote
! Seats 
! +/–
! Government
|-
! 2019
| 3,406
| 0.02%
| 
| –
| 
|}

References

2018 establishments in South Africa
Political parties established in 2018
Political parties in South Africa